Raharuhi Rukupō ( 1800s – 29 September 1873), also known by his anglicised name Lazarus Rukupō, was a notable Māori tribal leader and carver of New Zealand. He identified with the Rongowhakaata iwi. He was born in Manutūkē, near Gisborne, New Zealand. Some of his most famous carvings was the Te Toki-a-Tāpiri war canoe in 1840, which is displayed in the Auckland War Memorial Museum, and the carvings inside the Toko Toru Tapu Church in Manutuke near Gisborne.

References

1800s births
1873 deaths
New Zealand woodcarvers
Rongowhakaata people
New Zealand Māori carvers